Strangers are people who are unknown to another person or group.

Strangers or The Strangers may also refer to:

History
 Elizabethan Strangers or Strangers, a name applied to French and Belgian immigrants to Norwich, East Anglia, England, during the Middle Ages
 Strangers (Parliament of the United Kingdom), people in the Houses of Parliament who are not Members of Parliament or officials

Books
 Strangers (Dozois novel), 1978
 Strangers (Koontz novel), 1986
 Strangers (Yamada novel), 1987
 Strangers, novel by  Anita Brookner
 The Strangers, novel by katherena vermette

Comics
 Strangers (French comic book), a series published by Semic Comics in France and Image Comics in the U.S.
 Strangers (Malibu Comics), a comic book series
 Strangers (Marvel Comics), a pair of comic book characters

Film
 Strangers, the title of the original 1954 theatrical release of Roberto Rossellini's Journey to Italy 
 Strangers: The Story of a Mother and Daughter, a 1979 American TV film starring Bette Davis and Gena Rowlands
 Strangers (1991 film), an Australian film
 Strangers (1992 film), an American TV film starring Linda Fiorentino
 Strangers (2007 Hindi film), an Indian Hindi-language movie starring Jimmy Shergill
 Strangers (2007 Israeli film), an Israeli experimental fictional film by Guy Nattiv and Erez Tadmor
 Strangers (2022 film), a Nigerian drama
 Strangers (upcoming film), a British film directed by Andrew Haigh
 The Strangers (film series), a series of American psychological-slasher horror films
 The Strangers (2008 film), the first film in the series
 The Strangers: Prey at Night, a 2018 sequel
 Untitled third The Strangers film, the third installment in the series, and first film in a new trilogy
 The Strangers (2012 film), a Philippine film

Podcasts
 Strangers (podcast), an independent podcast hosted by Lea Thau

Television
 Strangers (1978 TV series), an ITV police drama set in the North West of England
 Strangers (1996 TV series), a French-Canadian anthology series, with one episode directed by Damian Harris
 Strangers (2017 TV series), an American comedy-drama streaming television series
 Strangers (2018 TV series), an ITV drama series set in Hong Kong
 "Strangers" (thirtysomething), an episode of the series Thirtysomething
 "Strangers" (The Walking Dead), an episode of the television series The Walking Dead

Music

Artists
 The Strangers (American band), a band that backed Merle Haggard
 The Strangers (Australian band), Australian band
 The Strangers with Mike Shannon, South African outfit

Albums
 Strangers (Ed Harcourt album), 2004
 Strangers (Merle Haggard album), 1965
 The Strangers (soundtrack), from the 2008 film (see above)
 Strangers (video), Keane documentary DVD
 Strangers, international debut album by Tomoyasu Hotei

Songs
 "Strangers" (Bring Me the Horizon song), 2022
 "Strangers" (City and Colour song), 2019
 "Strangers" (Halsey song), 2017
 "Strangers" (Kay song), 2012
 "Strangers" (The Kinks song), 1970
 "Strangers" (Laura Tesoro and Loïc Nottet song), 2020
 "Strangers" (Seven Lions and Myon & Shane 54 song), 2013
 "Strangers" (Sigrid song), 2017
 "Strangers" (Tia Gostelow song), 2018
 "Strangers" (Van She song), 2008
"(My Friends Are Gonna Be) Strangers", by Merle Haggard, 1994
 "Strangers", by David Gates from Never Let Her Go, 1975
 "Strangers", by Dom Dolla and Mansionair, 2021
 "Strangers", by DragonForce from Extreme Power Metal, 2019
 "Strangers", by Elton John from A Single Man, 1998 reissue
 "Strangers", by James from Millionaires, 1999
 "Strangers", by Jonas Brothers from Happiness Begins, 2019
 "Strangers", by Portishead from Dummy, 1994
 "The Strangers", by St. Vincent from Actor, 2009

See also

 The Stranger (disambiguation), includes use of Stranger
 Familiar stranger (disambiguation)
 Perfect Stranger (disambiguation)
 Strange (disambiguation)
 Strangers on a Train (film)
 The Strangerers, British television science fiction comedy drama serial